Othon Henri del Caretto or Del Carretto, Marquis of Grana (1629 – Mariemont, Hainaut 15 June 1685) was an Imperial Army commander and political figure.

Descendant from an old Italian noble family, he was titular Margrave of Savona, Marquis of Grana, Count of Millesimo, etc. He became instantly famous on 11 August 1675 in the Battle of Konzer Brucke, he engaged the right flank on exactly the right moment against the French under François de Créquy, inflicting a severe defeat. On the battlefield a Grana-memorial was erected in 1892.
   
He became a Knight of the Golden Fleece in 1678, Field Marshal of the Empire, Imperial ambassador in Madrid and General Captain and Governor of the Spanish Netherlands in April 1682.

On 31 July 1667 he married Countess Maria Theresia von Herberstein (Graz 1641 – Brussels 1682), widow of Franz Adam Graf von Losenstein.

They had two daughters:

 Maria Enrichetta (Vienna 1671 – Drogenbos 1744), Margravine of Savona and Marquesses of Grana, Countess of Millesimo, etc., married Philippe Charles d'Arenberg, 3rd Duke of Arenberg and Duke of Arschot (1663–1691) in Brussels on 12 February 1684, who was killed in the Battle of Slankamen.
 Maria Gabriella, (Vienna 1675 – Brussels before 1700), married Charles François de la Barre, Comte d’Erquelinnes et de Olloy, Baron de Hierges in 1690.

After the death of his first wife Othon Henri married, on 10 June 1683, Maria Theresa d’Arenberg (1666–1716), sister of his son-in-law.

Sources 
 
 Arenberg family

1629 births
1685 deaths
Governors of the Habsburg Netherlands
Knights of the Golden Fleece
Margraves of Italy
Field marshals of the Holy Roman Empire